Vivek Krishna (born 12 September 1990) is an Indian former cricketer. He played one List A match for Hyderabad in 2011.

See also
 List of Hyderabad cricketers

References

External links
 

1990 births
Living people
Indian cricketers
Hyderabad cricketers
People from Hanamkonda district